Lubuk Basung is a town or Sub-district in Agam Regency, of West Sumatra province of Indonesia and it is the seat (capital) of Agam Regency.

Populated places in West Sumatra
Regency seats of West Sumatra